Mónica Bosch (born 9 September 1972) is a Spanish former alpine skier who competed in the 1994 Winter Olympics and in the 1998 Winter Olympics.

References

1972 births
Living people
Spanish female alpine skiers
Olympic alpine skiers of Spain
Alpine skiers at the 1994 Winter Olympics
Alpine skiers at the 1998 Winter Olympics
Universiade medalists in alpine skiing
Universiade gold medalists for Spain
Competitors at the 1995 Winter Universiade